National Route 176 is a national highway of Japan connecting Miyazu, Kyoto and Kita-ku, Osaka in Japan, with a total length of 154.2 km (95.82 mi).

References

176
Roads in Hyōgo Prefecture
Roads in Kyoto Prefecture
Roads in Osaka Prefecture